Clematicissus is a plant genus in the family Vitaceae.

References

External links
 
 
 

Vitaceae genera
Vitaceae